John Estlin  may refer to:

John Prior Estlin (1747–1817), English Unitarian minister
John Bishop Estlin (1785–1855), English ophthalmic surgeon, son of the minister